Ariel Levy Dor (born 28 September 1984) is a Chilean actor and professional wrestler. He is best known for playing Javier Fernández, the main character in the Nicolás López comic film trilogy Qué pena tu..., Pablo 'Carpa' Parra in Mala Conducta, Adamo Curilén in La Sexóloga, Ariel in Aftershock and Alejandro in The Green Inferno.

In parallel to his career as an actor, Ariel started in 2015 a career as a professional wrestler in his native Chile, becoming one of the main faces of CNL Chile, one of the biggest wrestling promotions in the country, and even becoming the CNL National Champion. In 2018, Levy announced that he was chosen for the first WWE South American Tryout, to be held in Santiago, Chile.

Acting career 
Levy made his debut as a film actor in the film "Promedio Rojo" (2004), by Nicolás López, in which he played Roberto Rodríguez. Later, he acted in the short film "Súper niño bully" (2007).

In addition, he has acted on television, making his debut in the television series "EsCool" playing "Matías Jarpa" and participating mainly in youth series such as "Porky te amo", by Mega, "Vivir con 10" by Chilevisión, among others. In 2012, he performed for the first time in a nocturnal television series, in "La sexóloga".

On the other hand, since 2007, Levy has been part of the garage rock band Don Nadie, where he is voice and guitar, along with Andrés Larraín (drums), Matías Vega (bass and choruses) and Fernando Wurmann (guitar and choirs). ) .2 3 In 2009, the band released an album with ten songs.4

Since 2010, Levy has acted in the trilogy of director Nicolás López, "Qué pena tu vida", "Qué pena tu boda" and "Qué pena tu familia", which also made a series broadcast on Netflix called "Qué pena tu serie".

Levy has been part of the international films Aftershock and The Green Inferno, the latter directed by director Eli Roth.

In the year 2017, he began his career in Mexico with films like "Hazlo como hombre".

Wrestling 
He began his career in Lucha Libre in 2015, debuting at the Chilean company "National Wrestling Championship" (CNL), which offered training and fight in events transmitted by various Internet platforms. On 3 August 2016, he called himself CNL Hollywood International Champion, thus holding the unofficial CNL championship. On 30 August, he was involved in a live fight during a radio broadcast; however, it was part of an advertising campaign for a CNL event. After several opportunities, on 30 September 2018, he becomes for the first time National Wrestling Champion CNL, winning the most important championship of that company. In the recordings for CNL Manía, broadcast on 7 December 2019, Ariel became for the second time a National Wrestling Champion CNL.

Since 2015, Ariel has fought in various companies of Lucha Libre in Chile, among these, are "5 Luchas Clandestino", "Acción Sin Límites", "Fénix Lucha Libre Chile", "Impacto Iquique", "Xtreme Club Lucha Libre" , "Fight Chile" and "Wrestling Superstars". Ariel, won for the first time an official championship of a wrestling company, on 26 January 2018, winning the "Wrestling Superstar Tag Team Championship" of the company. Ariel has also been twice champion in Xtreme Club Lucha Libre, obtaining a championship that changes the name of the person who carries it, calling itself during the reign of Ariel, Xtreme Club Hollywood Championship. On 10 August 2019, Ariel becomes FNX Champion, bearing the most important title of the company.

On 25 October, the company CNL, announced that Ariel Levy had been selected among the 45 selected from all Latin America to participate in the first Tryout of Latin Americans of the WWE, which would take place from 2 to 4 December in Santiago. Due to an injury, he could not participate in the physical tests, but confirmed that he did in the other tests and once recovered he would participate in the missing ones. On 7 December, Ariel on his Instagram account reported that he was participating in a new WWE Tryout in Florida, USA. On 19 July 2020, he participated in a WWE special on YouTube, making the preview of the WWE Extreme Rules PPV with other wrestler and commentators of the company. On 27 September of the same year, he was again in the WWE preview, for the WWE Clash of Champions PPV. He reappears in a WWE pre-show, for the WWE Wrestlemania Backlash event. On 21 May 2021, it is confirmed that Ariel was again in a WWE Tryout in Florida, United States

In November 2020, Levy begins his tour of the United States, debuting for Coastal Championship Wrestling (CCW) with a victory. He has also wrestled in NAWA Wrestling and AEW Dark. On 17 January 2021, Levy became a champion in the United States for the first time by winning the CCW Tag Team Championship.

Championships and accomplishments 
Campeonato Nacional de Lucha Libre
Campeonato Nacional de CNL (2 times)

Fénix Lucha Libre
Campeonato de FNX (1 time)

Sandwiches & Lucha Show
Torneo en Equipos (2018) – with Kristy

Wrestling Superstar
 Campeonato en Parejas de Wrestling Superstar (1 time) – with Connor

Xtreme Club Lucha Libre
Campeonato Hollywood de Xtreme Club (2 times)

Coastal Championship Wrestling (CCW)
CCW World Champion (1 time)
CCW Tag Team Champion (1 time) – with Vinicious as The South American Alliance

Filmography

References

External links 

 Seth Meyers Talks With Ariel Levy on The New Yorker Radio Hour

1984 births
21st-century Chilean male actors
Chilean Jews
Chilean male film actors
Chilean male professional wrestlers
21st-century Chilean male singers
Chilean male television actors
Jewish Chilean sportspeople
Jewish professional wrestlers
Living people
Male actors from Santiago
21st-century professional wrestlers